Yegor Alexandrovich Rykov (born 14 April 1997) is a Russian professional ice hockey defenceman who is currently playing for Admiral Vladivostok of the Kontinental Hockey League (KHL).

Playing career
Rykov was drafted 132nd overall by the New Jersey Devils in the 2016 NHL Entry Draft. Despite being drafted, Rykov extended his KHL contract with the SKA Saint Petersburg until 30 April 2019. On 22 February 2018, the Devils traded his playing rights, along with a second-round draft pick in the 2018 NHL Entry Draft, to the New York Rangers in exchange for forward Michael Grabner. Rykov received little playing time with SKA to begin the 2018–19 season, and was subsequently traded to HC Sochi. On 20 May 2019, Rykov signed an entry-level contract with the New York Rangers.

In his debut North American season in 2019–20 after attending the Rangers training camp, Rykov was assigned to AHL affiliate the Hartford Wolf Pack. Limited to 27 games, Rykov contributed with 2 goal and 11 points, before the season was prematurely cancelled due to the COVID-19 pandemic. 

Approaching the second year of his contract with the Rangers and with the 2020–21 North American season to be delayed, Rykov returned to Russia on loan signing a one-year contract with CSKA Moscow of the KHL on 7 August 2020.

International play
Rykov played in the 2016 World Junior Ice Hockey Championships where he helped team Russia win a silver medal.

Career statistics

Regular season and playoffs

International

Awards and honors

References

External links
 

1997 births
Living people
Admiral Vladivostok players
HC CSKA Moscow players
Hartford Wolf Pack players
New Jersey Devils draft picks
Russian ice hockey defencemen
Severstal Cherepovets players
SKA-1946 players
SKA-Neva players
SKA Saint Petersburg players
HC Sochi players